Torrazza may refer to:

 Torrazza, a former Italian municipality; now part of Imperia
 Torrazza Coste, an Italian town in the province of Pavia
 Torrazza Piemonte, an Italian town in the province of Turin